

Events
 January 14 – Hans von Bülow interrupts a performance of Franz Liszt's Die Ideale at the Berlin Singakademie to ask for hostile elements in the audience to be silent.
January 22 – The First Piano Concerto of Johannes Brahms is given its first public performance in Hanover. 
 February 8 – Count Michael Wielhorsky invites musical associates to his home in an attempt to revive the Symphonic Society; this indirectly results in the formation of the Russian Musical Society, under the patronage of Grand Duchess Elena Pavlovna and her protégé, Anton Rubinstein.
 March 4 – Charter of the French Opera House, New Orleans, which opens on December 1 of the same year with a gala performance of Rossini's William Tell.
 March 11 – Giuseppe Verdi announces his retirement to friends at a dinner party.
March 12 –  The Prelude to Act 1 of Tristan und Isolde receives its first public performance at the Sophieninselsaal in Prague, in a charity concert in aid of poor medical students, conducted by Hans von Bülow, who provided his own concert ending for the occasion.
 April 3 – Richard Wagner takes up residence in Lucerne, Switzerland.
 April 4 – Bryants Minstrels give the first performance of "Dixie" at Mechanics' Hall, New York City.
 April 4 – Tannhäuser is performed at the Stadt Theater in New York City under the musical direction of Carl Bergmann. It is the first performance of a Wagner opera in the United States.
 May 6 – At the first concert of the Victoria Philharmonic Society, its future conductor John Bayley is a soloist on both clarinet and violin.
 July 1 – A monument to George Frideric Handel (by Hermann Heidel) is unveiled in his birthplace, Halle; Franz Liszt is among those present.
 October 23 – Richard Wagner and an ailing Hector Berlioz meet in Paris and make up their differences.
 December 19 – César Franck inaugurates the new organ at the basilia of Sainte-Clotilde, Paris, an instrument built by Aristide Cavaillé-Coll.
Alexander Borodin begins a period of chemical research at Heidelberg, working on benzene derivatives.
Alberto Mazzucato becomes musical director of La Scala opera house.
Richard Wagner finishes his opera Tristan und Isolde.  The Prelude to Act 1 receives its first public performance on March 2.

Published popular music
 "Darling little blue eyed Nell" w. B. E. Woolf m. Frederick Buckley
 "I’m on My Journey Home" Sarah Lancaster
 "Thou Art the Queen of My Song" Stephen Foster
 In 1859, John Freeman Young published the English translation of Silent Night that is most frequently sung today.
 "Upidee", arranged by H. G. Spaulding

Classical music
Charles-Valentin Alkan – Concerto for Solo Piano
Mily Balakirev – Overture to King LearHector Berlioz 
arrangement of Plaisir d’amour, H.134
Hymne pour la consécration du nouveau tabernacle, H 135
Johannes Brahms
Piano Concerto No. 1
Serenade No. 2 in A
Psalm 13, Op.27
Max Bruch 
Piano Trio, Op.5
String Quartet No. 1 in C minor, Op. 9
 Felix Draeseke – Helges Treue Jules Egghard – Méditation d'une jeune fille, Op.41
 Edvard Grieg
 23 Little Piano Pieces, EG 104
 Siehst du das Meer, for voice and piano
 Fromental Halévy – Italie (cantata)
 Friedrich Hegar – Violin Sonata in C minor
 Stephen Heller – 2 Valses, Op.93
 Theodor Kirchner – 16 Preludes, Op.9
 Franz LisztTotentanzfirst version of Psalm 23
Prelude after a theme from Weinen, Klagen, Sorgen, Zagen for pianoDeux Épisodes d'apres le Faust de Lenau (orchestral arrangement)
Festgesang, S.26Te Deum II for chorus, organ, brass and percussion, S. 27
Künstlerfestzug zur Schillerfeier 1859, S.114
Giacomo Meyerbeer –  Le revenant du vieux château de Bade, ballade
Stanisław Moniuszko – Śpiewnik domowy No.5
Michał Kleofas Ogiński – 6 Polonaises
Joachim Raff – 6 Morceaux, Op.85
Stanislas Verroust 
Solo de concert No.4, Op.77
Solo de concert No.5, Op.78
Solo de concert No.6, Op.79

Opera
César Cui – The Mandarin's SonFélicien David – Herculanum, premiered March 4 in Paris
Léo Delibes – L'Omelette à la FollembucheCharles Gounod – Faust first performed March 19 in Paris.  Libretto by Jules Barbier and Michel Carré, based on a work by Johann Wolfgang von Goethe.
Giacomo Meyerbeer – Le pardon de PloërmelGiuseppe Verdi – Un ballo in maschera, premiered February 17 in Rome.

Musical theater
Jacques Offenbach Geneviève de Brabant, original version. Premiered November 19 in Paris.Les vivandières de la grande arméeBirths
January 26 – W. O. Forsyth, pianist and composer (died 1937)
February 1 – Victor Herbert, cellist, conductor and composer (died 1924)
March 8 
Karl Eduard Goepfart, composer (died 1942)
Otto Taubmann, composer (died 1929)
April 3 – Reginald de Koven, US composer (died 1920)
April 5 – Wilhelm Harteveld, composer (died 1927)
April 11 – Basil Harwood, organist and composer (died 1949)
May 13 – August Enna, composer (died 1939)
June 22 – Frank Heino Damrosch, founder of Institute of Music (died 1937)
June 27 – Mildred J. Hill, composer of "Happy Birthday to You" (died 1916)
July 11 – Alfred Maria Willner, composer (died 1929)
July 15 – Carlo Munier, musician (died 1911)
July 21 – Charles H. Taylor, lyricist (died 1907)
September 21 – Otto Lohse, conductor and composer (died 1925)
September 24 – Julius Klengel, cellist, composer (died 1933)
October 14 – Camille Chevillard, conductor and composer (died 1923)
October 20 – Guglielmo Zuelli, opera composer (died 1941)
October 26 – Arthur Friedheim, Russian-born pianist
November 15 – Joseph Vidal, composer (died 1924)
November 17 – Gerhard Rosenkrone Schjelderup, composer (died 1933)
November 19 – Mikhail Ippolitov-Ivanov, conductor and composer (died 1935)
November 22 – Cecil Sharp, folk music revivalist (died 1924)
November 30 – Sergei Lyapunov, pianist and composer (died 1924)
December 21 – Max Fiedler, conductor and composer (died 1939)
December 23 – Adrian Ross, English lyricist (died 1933)
December 24 – Roman Statkowski, composer (died 1925)
December 27 – William Henry Hadow, musicologist (died 1937)
December 30 – Josef Bohuslav Foerster, composer (died 1951)

Deaths
January 7 – Peter Ferdinand Funck, violinist and composer (born 1788)
January 13 – Francisco José Debali, composer (born 1791)
January 20 – Bettina von Arnim, composer (born 1785)
February 6 – Jane Stirling, pianist and friend of Frédéric Chopin (born 1804; ovarian cyst)
February 26 – Ferdinand Lukas Schubert, composer (born 1794)
March 14 – Nicola Tacchinardi, cellist and operatic tenor (born 1772)
March 30 – Philippe Musard, composer (born 1792)
April 14 – Ignaz Bösendorfer, piano manufacturer (born 1796)
July 23 – Marceline Desbordes-Valmore, actress, singer and poet (born 1786)
July 29 
Léon-Lévy Brunswick, librettist (born 1805)
Auguste Mathieu Panseron, composer and singing teacher (born 1796)
August 18 – Antonio D'Antoni, opera composer and conductor (born 1801)
August 28 – Edward Holmes, musicologist, music critic, pianist and music educator (born 1797)
October 16 – John Fane, 11th Earl of Westmorland, soldier, politician, diplomat and musician (born 1784)
October 22 – Louis Spohr, violinist, conductor and composer (born 1784)
November 7 – Carl Gottlieb Reißiger, Kapellmeister and composer (born 1798)
December 13 – Daniel Liszt, son of Franz Liszt and Countess Marie d'Agoult (born 1839; tuberculosis)
December 31 – Luigi Ricci, composer (born 1805)Date unknown'' – Lewis Henry Lavenu, conductor, composer and impresario (born 1818)

References

 
19th century in music
Music by year